Bunium bulbocastanum is a plant species in the family Apiaceae. 
It was once used as a root vegetable in parts of western Europe, and has been called great pignut or earthnut.

Growth
The plant is native to western Europe.

The small, rounded taproot is edible raw or cooked, and said to taste like sweet chestnuts. The leaf can be used as an herb or garnish similar to parsley.

References

External links
 
 

Apioideae
Flora of Europe
Edible Apiaceae
Spices
Root vegetables
Plants described in 1753
Taxa named by Carl Linnaeus